Elvis M. Grbac (born August 13, 1970) is an American former football quarterback who played in the National Football League (NFL) for nine seasons, most notably with the Kansas City Chiefs. He played college football at Michigan, where he won the Sammy Baugh Trophy, and was selected by the San Francisco 49ers in the eighth round in the 1993 NFL Draft. Grbac spent his first four seasons as a backup with the 49ers before playing his next four seasons as the Chiefs' starter.

On the Chiefs, Grbac would help lead the team to two playoff berths and one division title, along with earning Pro Bowl honors in 2000. However, his tenure would also be known for a quarterback controversy with Rich Gannon during the 1997 season. The Chiefs' decision to start Grbac over Gannon drew retrospective criticism due to Gannon having greater success on the rival Oakland Raiders. Grbac played his final season for the Baltimore Ravens. After retiring he became athletic director at Villa Angela-St. Joseph High School, the high school he attended as a student.

Early life
Grbac was born in Cleveland to Ivan and Cecilija Grbac His father was born in Lanišće, near Buzet, Istria, Croatia, and his mother was also from Istria. His parents left Croatia in 1967. Grbac has one brother, Engelbert, and two sisters, Maria and Barbara.

Grbac attended St. Joseph High School, where he played basketball and football. One of his high-school teammates was future Heisman Trophy winner Desmond Howard.

College career
Although Grbac initially wished to continue his football career at Ohio State, he changed his mind when the Buckeyes fired head coach Earle Bruce and opted instead to join Howard at the University of Michigan, where he played college football from 1989 to 1992. He led the Wolverines to a Gator Bowl in 1991, three Rose Bowls in 1990, 1992 and 1993 and is best remembered for playing with wide receiver Desmond Howard during Howard's Heisman-winning season in 1991. In 1991 Grbac's pass to Howard sealed a 24–14 victory over Notre Dame. In the game Grbac completed 20-of-22 passes, a record for a Notre Dame opponent. He finished his career at Michigan as the school's all-time leader in passing attempts (835), completions (522), passing yards (6,460) and passing touchdowns (71). These records were later broken by John Navarre in 2003 and surpassed by Chad Henne in 2006–2007. In 1992, he won the Sammy Baugh Trophy.

Grbac also established the Big Ten Conference career passing efficiency record that would stand for six seasons until it was surpassed by Joe Germaine. Grbac was a two-time National Collegiate Athletic Association (NCAA) passing efficiency champion during his last two seasons. He was a three-time Big Ten champion in this statistic.

Statistics

NFL career

NFL Draft
Grbac was drafted in the eighth round (219th overall) of the 1993 NFL Draft by the San Francisco 49ers, where he served as Steve Young's backup from 1994 to 1996.

San Francisco 49ers
Grbac had an injury and was taken in and out of the lineup by coach George Seifert, Grbac played in 11 games in his rookie season only throwing for two touchdown passes in games against the Minnesota Vikings and the Tampa Bay Buccaneers; he threw one interception. During his rookie season he posted a QB rating of 98.2, with two touchdowns, and completing 35-of-55 pass attempts. He appeared in a total of sixteen games with the 49ers, five of them as the starting quarterback. In Week 11, he led the 49ers to an upset victory over the eventual Super Bowl champion Dallas Cowboys, 38–20, throwing for two touchdowns and running for a third. Grbac ended the season with a QB rating of 96.6, 183 passes attempted and 127 completed, eight passing touchdowns and two rushing, for a total of 1,469 yards gained. During the 1996 season, he played a total of 15 regular season games, four as a starter, passing for 10 touchdowns and rushing for two, with a total of 122 passes completed and 1,236 yards gained. In 1997, he signed a contract with the Kansas City Chiefs becoming their quarterback.

Kansas City Chiefs
Grbac replaced Steve Bono as the Chiefs starter in 1997. He orchestrated a Monday Night Football comeback in Week Two against the Oakland Raiders. Despite trailing by two touchdowns late in the second half, he rallied the Chiefs by directing a six-play, 80-yard touchdown drive without the benefit of a single time-out, culminating that comeback with a 32-yard game-winner to Andre Rison with 0:03 remaining to seal a 28–27 Chiefs win.

In the 1997 season, Grbac led the Chiefs to their fourth AFC West Division championship, as the team finished the year with six consecutive victories, a first in team history. The 1997 season was also the beginning of a quarterback controversy, when Grbac started the first nine games and suffered an injury, leading to Rich Gannon's substitution for the next six games. Grbac would return in the team's season finale. Gannon won five consecutive starts down the stretch to help the Chiefs earn home-field advantage with a 13–3 record. Grbac was an excellent quarterback, and a talented thrower, while Gannon was an aggressive leader who demanded the most of his players. Grbac was selected by coach Marty Schottenheimer to start the team's playoff game against the Denver Broncos, which the Chiefs would lose 14–10 amid an ineffective performance from Grbac. Chiefs fans were divided over whether Gannon or Grbac should lead the team. Eventually Grbac was chosen to remain the Chiefs starting quarterback, Gannon was let go and signed with the Raiders in 1999.
In 1998, the Chiefs struggled in the highly competitive AFC West. Grbac completed only 98-of-188 attempts, for five touchdowns, and gained 1,142 yards in this season. For 1999, the Chiefs won 2nd place in the AFC West. Grbac had a 9–7 record, starting all 16 games. In the final game of the season against the Oakland Raiders, the Chiefs were denied a trip to the playoffs and an AFC West division title when Raiders kicker Joe Nedney kicked a game-winning field-goal in overtime. In 2000, Grbac passed for 4,169 yards and 28 touchdowns with a passer rating of 89.9 en route to the 2001 Pro Bowl.

Grbac finished his four seasons in Kansas City by throwing for 10,643 yards, having 66 touchdowns to 47 interceptions, and a record of 26–21. Despite some success, Grbac became unpopular among Chiefs fans because the team's decision to start him over Gannon. Whereas Grbac went winless in the postseason, Gannon led the division rival Raiders to Super Bowl XXXVII during the 2002 season while earning MVP honors.

Baltimore Ravens
Grbac signed a free-agent contract with the Baltimore Ravens in 2001 to replace former starter Trent Dilfer. The contract was for over five years and was worth $30 million. While Dilfer had been the starting quarterback of Baltimore's Super Bowl winning team, he was seen as a game manager who benefited from a dominant defense, and the Ravens wished to upgrade at the quarterback position.

Although the Ravens recorded a 10–6 regular season record and qualified for the playoffs, Grbac's performance was considered a disappointment. He performed statistically below Dilfer's performance in the previous season and two of the Ravens' wins occurred when Randall Cunningham started as a quarterback. During the postseason, the Ravens were defeated 27–10 by the Pittsburgh Steelers in the divisional round; Grbac threw three interceptions and no touchdowns.

At the end of the season, the Ravens released Grbac in a salary cap move after he refused to renegotiate his contract. At the time of his retirement, Grbac had been in negotiations with the Denver Broncos as a backup to Brian Griese, but Grbac opted for retirement. Baltimore's free agent signing of Grbac is considered among the league's worst due to his inefficient performance and lasting only one season with the team.

NFL career statistics

Peoples Sexiest Athlete
Grbac was featured as Peoples Sexiest Athlete in 1998. Sportswriter Jeff Pearlman said this was a mistake by a photographer who, under instructions to profile "the Chiefs quarterback", accidentally took pictures of Grbac instead of the intended Rich Gannon. The story was later confirmed by a People employee.

Coaching career
Grbac lives in Chagrin Falls and was an assistant quarterbacks coach for St. Ignatius High School in Cleveland, Ohio. On April 10, 2019, Grbac was named the athletic director and head football coach at his alma mater Villa Angela-St. Joseph High School. In addition to his roles in the athletic department, he will also be the head of the Marianist Urban Student Program (MUSP) at the school.

Personal life
Grbac has a brother, Engelbert, and two sisters, Maria and Barbara. He lives in Chagrin Falls, just outside Cleveland, with his wife Lori (née Immarino) and his three children: Ella, Jack, and Calvin. Grbac reverted to Catholicism when he was going through his "dark times".

See also
 List of 500-yard passing games in the National Football League
 List of NCAA major college football yearly passing leaders
 Lists of Michigan Wolverines football passing leaders

References

1970 births
Living people
American football quarterbacks
Baltimore Ravens players
Michigan Wolverines football players
Kansas City Chiefs players
San Francisco 49ers players
American Conference Pro Bowl players
Players of American football from Cleveland
American people of Croatian descent
People from Chagrin Falls, Ohio
Catholics from Ohio